Su-mi, also spelled Soo-mi, is a Korean feminine given name. The meaning differs based on the hanja used to write each syllable of the name. There are 67 hanja with the reading "su" and 33 hanja with the reading "mi" on the South Korean government's official list of hanja which may be registered for use in given names.

People with this name include:
Kim Soo-mi (born Kim Young-ok, 1951), South Korean actress
Sumi Jo (born 1962), South Korean lyric coloratura soprano
Sue Mi Terry (Korean name Kim Sue-mi, born ), American intelligence analyst
Sumi Hwang (born 1986), South Korean soprano
Lee Soo-mi (born 1989), South Korean singer, former member of SeeYa, F-ve Dolls, and Coed School
Shin Su-mi, pen name Shin Ji-sang, South Korean manhwa artist

Fictional characters with this name include:
Bae Su-mi, in 2003 South Korean film A Tale of Two Sisters
Choi Soo-mi, in 2012 South Korean television series Man from the Equator

See also
List of Korean given names

References

Korean feminine given names